Ahmadalilar Mausoleum is a mausoleum in the Əhmədalılar village of Fuzuli Rayon, Azerbaijan. It was built in the 13th century.

Architecture
The mausoleum is octahedral and covered with a cloistered vault. It is identical to Sheykh Babi Yagub Mausoleum located not far away. It is a part of a group of octahedral mausoleums including Shaykh Babi Yagub Mausoleum in Fuzuli Rayon, Seyid Yahya Bakuvi Mausoleum in Baku, a mausoleum in Hazra village of Qusar Rayon and others.

Its internal area is divided into a burial vault and a spacious upper cell. There are two portals, decorated with geometrical ornaments. There is no ciborium in the upper cell.

References

Islamic architecture
Mausoleums in Azerbaijan
Tourist attractions in Azerbaijan
Fuzuli District